Varma is a Latvian icebreaker. She was built at the Wärtsilä Helsinki Shipyard, Finland and delivered to the Finnish National Board of Navigation in 1968. The vessel was transferred to Latvia in 1994.

References 

Ships of Latvia
Icebreakers of Latvia
1968 ships
Ships built in Helsinki